Azovmash Arena is an Indoor sports arena at Mariupol, Ukraine. The arena has a seating capacity for 3,000 spectators and is the home venue of Azovmash Mariupol.

References

Basketball venues in Ukraine
Indoor arenas in Ukraine
Sport in Mariupol
Sports venues in Donetsk Oblast